The Roewe RX8 is a mid-size SUV produced by SAIC Motor. It is the flagship SUV of the brand of Roewe, replacing the Roewe W5. It is also marketed as the MG RX8 in overseas markets.

Overview
The Roewe RX8 debuted in April 2018 at the Beijing Auto Show. The Roewe RX8 comes in five and seven seat variants, and shares a shortened, but same body-on-frame platform with the Maxus D90 full size SUV, which is also produced by SAIC Motor. 

Base Roewe RX8 models are rear-wheel drive and higher trim levels are all wheel drive.

MG RX8
Launched in September 2019 for the Middle Eastern market, the MG RX8 is a rebadged version of the Roewe RX8. It is powered by the same 2.0-litre turbo petrol engine shared by the Roewe RX8 and Maxus D90 mated to a 6-speed automatic transmission producing  of power and  torque. It was also launched for the Mexican market on 27 September 2021 with sales starting on 1 October 2021, only offered in the Elegance trim. A launch edition will also be sold limited to 300 units.

References

External links

Official website

RX8
Mid-size sport utility vehicles
Cars introduced in 2018
Cars of China
Luxury sport utility vehicles